Nadja Roma (born 27 July 1988) is a Swedish former professional tennis player.

Biography
A left-handed player from Stockholm, Roma represented the Sweden Fed Cup team in a total of seven ties. She was used mostly as a doubles player but played twice in singles, which included a win over Ekaterina Dzehalevich of Belarus.

Roma competed mainly on the ITF Circuit and won one singles and seven doubles titles during her career. She featured as a wildcard in the main draw of the 2008 Abierto Mexicano, a WTA Tour tournament in Acapulco, where she was beaten in the first round by Iveta Benešová.

Her younger sister Sandra also played professional tennis.

ITF finals

Singles: 4 (1–3)

Doubles: 11 (7–4)

See also
 List of Sweden Fed Cup team representatives

References

External links
 
 
 

1988 births
Living people
Swedish female tennis players
Tennis players from Stockholm
20th-century Swedish women
21st-century Swedish women